Decaen is a French surname. People of that name include:

Charles Mathieu Isidore Decaen (1769–1832), French general
Claude Théodore Decaen (1811–1870), French general

Surnames of French origin
French-language surnames